Herpetology (from Greek ἑρπετόν herpetón, meaning "reptile" or "creeping animal") is the branch of zoology concerned with the study of amphibians (including frogs, toads, salamanders, newts, and caecilians (gymnophiona)) and reptiles (including snakes, lizards, amphisbaenids, turtles, terrapins, tortoises, crocodilians, and the tuataras). Birds, which are cladistically included within Reptilia, are traditionally excluded here; the scientific study of birds is the subject of ornithology.

Thus, the definition of herpetology can be more precisely stated as the study of ectothermic (cold-blooded) tetrapods. Under this definition "herps" (or sometimes "herptiles" or "herpetofauna") exclude fish, but it is not uncommon for herpetological and ichthyological scientific societies to collaborate. Examples include publishing joint journals and holding conferences in order to foster the exchange of ideas between the fields, as the American Society of Ichthyologists and Herpetologists does. Many herpetological societies have been formed to promote interest in reptiles and amphibians, both captive and wild.

Herpetology offers benefits to humanity in the study of the role of amphibians and reptiles in global ecology. Amphibians are often very sensitive to environmental changes, offering a visible warning to humans that significant changes are taking place. Some toxins and venoms produced by reptiles and amphibians are useful in human medicine. Currently, some snake venom has been used to create anti-coagulants that work to treat strokes and heart attacks.

Naming and Etymology
People with an avid interest in herpetology and who keep different reptiles or amphibians often refer to themselves as "herpers".

"Herp" is a vernacular term for non-avian reptiles and amphibians. It is derived from the old term "herpetile", with roots back to Linnaeus's classification of animals, in which he grouped reptiles and amphibians together in the same class. There are over 6700 species of amphibians and over 9000 species of reptiles. In spite of its modern taxonomic irrelevance, the term has persisted, particularly in the names of herpetology, the scientific study of non-avian reptiles and amphibians, and herpetoculture, the captive care and breeding of reptiles and amphibians.

Subfields
The field of herpetology can be divided into areas dealing with particular taxonomic groups such as frogs (batrachology), snakes (ophiology or ophidiology), lizards (saurology) or turtles (cheloniology, chelonology or testudinology).

More generally, herpetologists work on functional problems in ecology, evolution, physiology, behavior etc. of amphibians and reptiles. That is, they chose to use amphibians or reptiles as model organisms for specific questions in these fields, such as the role of frogs in the ecology of a wetland. All of these areas are related through their evolutionary history, e.g. the evolution of viviparity (including behavior and reproduction).

Careers
Career options in the field of herpetology include, but are not limited to, lab research, field studies and survey, zoological staff, museum staff and college teaching.

In modern academic science, it is rare for individuals to consider themselves a herpetologist first and foremost. Most individuals focus on a particular field such as ecology, evolution, taxonomy, physiology, or molecular biology, and within that field ask questions pertaining to or best answered by examining reptiles and amphibians. For example, an evolutionary biologist who is also a herpetologist may choose to work on an issue such as the evolution of warning coloration in coral snakes.

Modern herpetological writers include Mark O'Shea and Philip Purser. Modern herpetological showmen include Jeff Corwin, Steve Irwin, popularly known as the "Crocodile Hunter", and the star Austin Stevens, popularly known as "Austin Snakeman" in the TV series Austin Stevens: Snakemaster.

Study
Most colleges or universities do not offer a major in herpetology at the undergraduate or even the graduate level. Instead, persons interested in herpetology select a major in the biological sciences. The knowledge learned about all aspects of the biology of animals is then applied to an individual study of herpetology.

Journals
Herpetology research is published in honour demic journals including Ichthyology & Herpetology, founded in 1913 (under the name Copeia in honour of Edward Drinker Cope); Herpetologica, founded in 1936; Reptiles and amphibians, founded in 1990; and Contemporary Herpetology, founded in 1997.

See also

 Herping
 List of herpetologists
 List of herpetology academic journals
Reptile Database
AmphibiaWeb

References

Further reading
Adler, Kraig (1989). Contributions to the History of Herpetology. Society for the Study of Amphibians and Reptiles.
Eatherley, Dan (2015). Bushmaster: Raymond Ditmars and the Hunt for the World's Largest Viper. New York: Arcade. 320 pp. .
Goin, Coleman J.; Goin, Olive B.; Zug, George R. (1978). Introduction to Herpetology, Third Edition. San Francisco: W. H. Freeman and Company. xi + 378 pp. .

External links

Iranian Herpetological Studies Institute (IHSI)
Field Herpetology Guide
American Society of Ichthyologists and Herpetologists
Herpetological Conservation and Biology
Societas Europaea Herpetologica Distribution Maps for European Reptiles and Amphibians
Center for North American Herpetology over 500 species of reptiles and amphibians
European Field Herping Community
New Zealand Herpetology 
Chicago Herpetological Society
Biology of the Reptilia is an online copy of the full text of a 22-volume 13,000-page summary of the state of research of reptiles.
HerpMapper is a database of reptile and amphibian sightings
Amphibian and Reptile Atlas of Peninsular California, San Diego Natural History Museum
A Primer on Reptiles and Amphibians
Field Herp Forum

 
Subfields of zoology
Scoutcraft